Arnold Lunger was an Italian luger who competed in the mid-1980s. A natural track luger, he won a bronze medal in the men's doubles event at the 1986 FIL Luge Natural Track Championships in Fénis-Aosta, Italy.

References
Natural track World Championships results: 1979-2007

Italian male lugers
Living people
Year of birth missing (living people)
Italian lugers
Sportspeople from Südtirol